"Leider" (German for Unfortunately) is a song by German rock band Eisbrecher and the first single from their album Antikörper. On 22 August 2006, a double-single titled "Leider/Vergissmeinnicht" was released in the US. It combines both of Eisbrecher singles from their second album.

Track listing 
 "Leider" – 4:09
 "Leider (Noel Pix Klingenklang-Mix)" – 4:40
 "Leider (The Retrosic-Mix)" – 4:57
 "Willkommen im Nichts" (Multimedia track)

2006 songs
Eisbrecher songs
Songs written by Noel Pix
Songs written by Alexander Wesselsky